Anthony Tupou (born 1 March 1983) is a former professional rugby league footballer who played as a  and  in the 2000s and 2010s. An Australian international and New South Wales State of Origin representative, he played for the Sydney Roosters, Cronulla-Sutherland Sharks and Newcastle Knights in the National Rugby League, while also having a stint in the Super League with the Wakefield Trinity Wildcats.

Background
Tupou was born in Newcastle, New South Wales, Australia. He attended school at St Francis Xavier's College, Hamilton.

Professional career

Sydney Roosters
Tupou made his first-grade début in 2004 against the South Sydney Rabbitohs. In the September 2004 issue of Big League magazine, after making his début with the Roosters, Tupou claimed that growing up his favourite player to watch was Queensland legend Mal Meninga. He also claimed that the biggest influence on his football was his father and his club coach Ricky Stuart. At the end of that season he played for the Roosters from the interchange bench in their 2004 NRL grand final loss to cross-Sydney rivals, the Bulldogs.

In 2005, Tupou made his representative début in the City vs Country Origin for the Country NSW team.

At the end of the 2006 season, Tupou was selected for the Australian team, as a replacement for Reni Maitua. He played four matches, scoring one try.

Tupou retained his Test spot in 2007 for the Anzac Test against New Zealand. Tupou made his début for New South Wales in Game 1 of the 2007 State of Origin series. His Test début came before his Origin debut. However, he was dropped for Game 2.

On 22 April 2008, Tupou announced that he had accepted a 4-year deal with the Cronulla Sharks worth 1.5 million dollars.

In August 2008, Tupou was named in the Australia training squad for the 2008 Rugby League World Cup. He was named in the Australia squad for the 2008 Rugby League World Cup, replacing Michael Crocker who withdrew through injury. Although also named in the Tonga training squad for the 2008 Rugby League World Cup, Tupou played for Australia.

Cronulla-Sutherland Sharks
Tupou played for the Sharks mainly at second-row forward. Tupou was named in NSW's preliminary 40-man squad for the 2009 State of Origin series. He was selected for Country in the City vs Country match on 8 May 2009.

In 2013, Tupou played for the Tonga national rugby league team in their Pacific Rugby League International clash with fierce rivals Samoa.

On 22 August 2014, Tupou became one of the current Sharks players to accept reduced bans from the Australian Sports Anti-Doping Authority for his role in the club's 2011 supplements scandal.

Wakefield Trinity Wildcats
On 2 November 2015, Tupou signed a 2-year contract with Super League side Wakefield Trinity Wildcats starting in 2016.

Newcastle Knights
In 2017, Tupou returned to his hometown to play for the Newcastle Knights on a 1-year contract. He made his Knights début in round 5 of the 2017 season against his former club Cronulla. With a hip injury limiting his time at the Knights to only four games, he announced his retirement in September 2017.

References

External links

Newcastle Knights profile
Cronulla-Sutherland Sharks profile

1983 births
Living people
Australia national rugby league team players
Australian sportspeople of Tongan descent
Australian rugby league players
Australian sportspeople in doping cases
Country New South Wales Origin rugby league team players
Cronulla-Sutherland Sharks players
Doping cases in Australian rugby league
Doping cases in rugby league
New South Wales Rugby League State of Origin players
Newcastle Knights players
NRL All Stars players
Prime Minister's XIII players
Rugby league locks
Rugby league players from Newcastle, New South Wales
Rugby league second-rows
Sydney Roosters players
Tonga national rugby league team players
Wakefield Trinity players
Western Suburbs Rosellas players